Walgak is a town in South Sudan. It made headlines as the location of the February 2013 massacre of over 100 people in the ongoing Murle-Nuer conflict. The Walgak area is susceptible to severe flooding.

Notes

References
 
 

State capitals in South Sudan
Jonglei State